Mount Whiting is a pyramidal mountain, largely ice free and steep cliffed on the south side, standing at the southwest side of Rankin Glacier near the east coast of Palmer Land. Mapped by United States Geological Survey (USGS) in 1974. Named by Advisory Committee on Antarctic Names (US-ACAN) for topographic engineer Ronald F. Whiting, a member of the USGS geological and mapping party to the Lassiter Coast area, 1970–71.

Mountains of Palmer Land